El Pequeño Mundo is the nineteenth studio album and the fourth in Spanish language album by Brazilian singer and TV host Xuxa Meneghel. It was released in October 1994 in Argentina by Polygram (today Universal Music).

Production
El Pequeño Mundo was directed by Manuel Calderón and was produced by Michael Sullivan. The graphic design was under the command of Xuxa and Reinaldo Waisman. Xuxa spent ten days in Miami recording his new album in Spanish. The song "Happy sí" that was composed by Carlinhos Brown, who also participates in music, the singer had to travel to Miami to re-record the Spanish version of the song.

"El Pequeño Mundo" is a Latin version of Xuxa's tenth Brazilian studio album, Sexto Sentido (1994). The tracks of the album are basically composed by Spanish versions of some songs from the Brazilian album, such as "Grito de Guerra" by Chiclete com Banana, and a cover version of "O Pato" by João Gilberto, and the unpublished "Muy Pequeño El Mundo Es ", "Que Sí, Que No" and Voy a Salir de Reventón". the song "Grito de Guerra", by Chiclete com Banana, was also recorded in Portuguese to enter the album Sexto Sentido, but only the Spanish version was released. The album also marks the change of international label of Xuxa, until then their albums were released by "Globo Records". This is the first Xuxa musical project released by Polygram/Mercury Records.

Release and reception

El Pequeño Mundo was first released in Argentina in mid-October 1994, shortly after throughout Latin America, Spain and the United States. In Chile, El Pequeño Mundo had positive sales reached the sixth position among the most sold in its first week, according to Billboard magazine.

Promotion
To promote the new album, Xuxa was in Buenos Aires in mid-December 1994, and made two Pocket Shows in the programs Hola Susana and Ritmo de la noche in Telefé. El Pequeño Mundo had sales of more than 120,000 copies.

Track listing

Personnel

Art Direction: Manuel Calderón
Graphic design: Xuxa Meneghel and Reinaldo Waisman
Directed by: Michael Sullivan
Production Assistant: Tania Mahon
Xuxa's Spanish voice direction: Graciela Carballo
Voice Direction: Akiko Endo (Japanese), Ugo Chiarato (Italian), Corinne Merkin (French), Hagai Goian (Hebrew)
Adult Chorus Voice Recording: Crescent Moon Studio
Choir: Rodolfo Castillo, Georgina Cruz, César Nascimento, Jorge Noriega, Wendy Pederson and Rita Quinter
Voice and choir adult – engineer: Carlos Alvarez
Arrangement and preparation of keyboards: Marcello Azevedo
Electric guitar: César Nascimento
Arrangement of metals: Ed Calle and Rodolfo Castillo
Musicians: Ed Calle, Tony Concepción, Dana Teboe, Tim Barnes, Glenn Basham, Rafael Elvira, Joan Falgen, PH
Recording of children's choir: Art Sullivan Home Studio, Castle Recording Studio
Children's Choir: Anthony Carvajal, Giovanni de Paz, Juliana Lima, Maya Mingyar, Manuel Pascual, Jessy Lin Pole
Engineers: Marcello Azevedo, Alfredo Matheus, Carlos Alvarez
Assistants: Sebastian Krys, Alfredo Matheus
Metal engraving: A Studio
Mixed in Crescent Moon: by Antonio Moog Canazio
Photos: Luis Crispino
Costume Designer: Willis Ribeiro
Hair: Márcia Regina Elias
Makeup Department: Roberto Fernandes

Chart

Release history

References

External links
 El Pequeño Mundo at Discogs

1994 albums
Xuxa albums
Spanish-language albums